Mulla Wahidi (born Syed Muhammad Irtiza) was a Pakistani writer and journalist. Wahidi was the editor of Nizam-ul-Mashaikh – a journal published by Khwaja Hasan Nizami.

Works
Dilli Ka Phera
Mera Afsana: Aap Biti

References

1888 births
1976 deaths
Urdu-language writers from British India
Pakistani journalists
20th-century journalists